The Rugby League All Stars Match of the National Rugby League is an annual rugby league football match between the specially-formed Indigenous All Stars and an All Stars team, both of whose members are made available for selection public vote. The game has been played since 2010 at a variety of venues across Australia. The player judged man-of-the-match is awarded the Preston Campbell Medal, named after indigenous Gold Coast player, Preston Campbell. Between 2010 and 2015, the Indigenous All Stars opponent was an NRL All Stars team, they were replaced for 2016 by a World All Stars team.

The first match took place on 13 February 2010 at the Gold Coast's Skilled Park and was won 16–12 by the Indigenous All Stars, and winning half-back Johnathan Thurston was awarded the inaugural Preston Campbell award for best player. Players from both sides were primarily chosen by the public, through a voting scheme through the official NRL website. Coaches from both sides then select the voted players into a make up squad, and players specially selected by the coaches are then included to create the full 20-man positional squad. Several rule alterations were also made exclusive to the All Stars which trialled such concepts like the "Double Try" and "Power Play" rule. In 2012, the match trophy was named in honour to indigenous rugby league legend Artie Beetson.

Rule variations
For 2010, the match exhibited several rule variations exclusive to the All stars match:
 A new double try or "power play" rule was trialled during the match. This rule gave a try-scoring team the option to attempt to score another try from a single play-the-ball instead of taking the usual place kicked conversion. The idea is similar to the try rule in American football whereby a touchdown-scoring team can choose to either kick a conversion goal or to attempt to convert via an additional touchdown. The double try would be worth a further four points. The following rules were applied to the double try attempt:
 The double try attempt was started by the attacking team with a play the ball in the centre of their opponents 20 metre line.
 The fullback on the defending team was required to leave the field of play for the duration of the play. This meant there were twelve defenders against thirteen attackers.
 The attacking team was prevented from kicking during the attempt, with the referee ending the play for a restart in the event that the ball was kicked. 
 If the defending team gained possession of the ball the play was over, this meant that the defending team could not score in this situation.
 If the defending team conceded a penalty, the double try would be awarded automatically. 
 The match was divided into quarters rather than halves with 20 minutes between each break. Quarter and three quarter breaks were in five-minute periods and conducted on the field. This is due to the fact that the match is played during summer. Team talks delivered by the coaches during the breaks were broadcast live for the first time.
 Teams had an unlimited interchange limit.
 The match contained four on-field officials, although two were able to referee at a time.
 The video referee was available to explain their decisions to the broadcast commentary team on air for the first time.

For the 2013 game, the following trial experimental rules were introduced:
Ruck Penalties
For infringements in the ruck area by the defending team (holding down, leg pull, hand on ball etc.) which does not result in the breakdown of play (i.e. drop ball), the referee will indicate the infringement by blowing his whistle and signaling the infringement. The match referee will then immediately signal the restart of the tackle count which shall occur at the point of the infringement with a zero tackle.
There will be no kick for touch for these infringements. Play will continue immediately from the point of the infringement via a play the ball. 
Any foul play in the ruck area by the defending team will result in a traditional penalty.
Any infringement by the attacking team in the ruck area will result in a traditional penalty.
Quick Restarts 
This will see an extension of the quick restart from the 20m, with players allowed quick penalty tap kicks/restarts (apart from ruck penalties) from the point of the offence. Captains questioning decisions will be restricted to when they are in possession and scrums. 
Restarts from Kicks 
For any attacking team that kicks the ball from the outside the opponents 30m line (30m from try line) and the ball goes dead in-goal, the opponent will receive the ball via a handover (tap restart) from the point where the kick originated once the match officials are in place.

Preston Campbell Medal
The Preston Campbell Medal is awarded to the man of the match and is exclusively voted by the public. The medal is named after Gold Coast Titans and indigenous star Preston Campbell, who was the first person that ventured the idea of the All Stars match.

Results

Overview

Note: The All Stars match was not contested in 2014 and 2018.

2010

2011

2012

2013

2015

2016

2017

2019

2020

2021

2022

Women's All Stars Matches Results
The Women's All Stars Match is the Women's rugby league version of the game and has been running since 2011.

Overview

2011

2012

2013

2014

The match was held as the main curtain raiser for the 2014 Anzac Test.

2015

The Women's All Stars exhibition match which was held as a curtain raiser for the men's 2015 All Stars match and was won by the NRL Women's All Stars 26-8.

2016

2017

2019

2020

2021

2022

See also

NRL All Stars match results and statistics

References

External links
 

NRL All Stars match
All-star games
National Rugby League
Rugby league matches
Recurring sporting events established in 2010
2010 establishments in Australia
Nine's Wide World of Sport